The following is an alphabetical list of articles related to the U.S. state of Utah.

0–9 

.ut.us – Internet second-level domain for the state of Utah
4 Corners
4 Corners Monument
XIX Olympic Winter Games
32nd meridian west from Washington
34th meridian west from Washington
37th meridian west from Washington
37th parallel north
38th parallel north
39th parallel north
40th parallel north
41st parallel north
42nd parallel north
110th meridian west
111th meridian west
112th meridian west
113th meridian west
114th meridian west
2003 Utah snowstorm

A
Adjacent states:

Agriculture in Utah
Airports in Utah
Allium cepa
Allosaurus
Alpha Ursae Majoris
Amusement parks in Utah
Apis mellifera
Arboreta in Utah
commons:Category:Arboreta in Utah
Archaeology of Utah
:Category:Archaeological sites in Utah
commons:Category:Archaeological sites in Utah
Architecture in Utah
Arches National Park
Art museums and galleries in Utah
commons:Category:Art museums and galleries in Utah
Artists in Utah
Ashley National Forest

B

Balanced Rock
Bear Lake
Bear River Migratory Bird Refuge
Beehive
Beehive Cluster
Benjamin Louis Eulalie de Bonneville
Bike paths in Utah
Bonneville, Benjamin Louis Eulalie de
Bonneville cutthroat trout
Botanical gardens in Utah
commons:Category:Botanical gardens in Utah
Bridger, Jim
Bridges in Utah
Bridges on the National Register of Historic Places in Utah
Brigham Young
Brigham Young University
Brigham Young University graduates
Bryce Canyon National Park
Buildings and structures in Utah
commons:Category:Buildings and structures in Utah

C

Calochortus nuttallii
Canyon Lands
Canyonlands National Park
Canyons and gorges of Utah
commons:Category:Canyons and gorges of Utah
Capital of the State of Utah
Capital punishment in Utah
Capitol of the State of Utah
Capitol Reef National Park
Catholic Community Services of Utah
Caribou-Targhee National Forest
Cedar Breaks National Monument
Census Designated Places in Utah
Census statistical areas in Utah
Cervus canadensis nelsoni
Cherry
Children's Service Society
Church of Jesus Christ of Latter-day Saints
Cities in Utah
Climate of Utah
:Category:Climate of Utah
commons:Category:Climate of Utah
Colleges and universities in Utah
Colorado Plateau
Colorado River
Committees of the 57th Utah State Legislature
Communications in Utah
commons:Category:Communications in Utah
Companies based in Utah
Community Action Services and Food Bank
Constitution of the State of Utah
Convention centers in Utah
commons:Category:Convention centers in Utah
Copper
Counties in Utah
County seats in Utah
Crime in Utah
Cuisine of Utah
commons:Category:Utah cuisine
Culture of Utah
commons:Category:Utah culture

D
Demographics of Utah
Deseret (disambiguation)
State of Deseret
Dinosaur National Monument
Diversity organizations in Utah
Dixie (Utah)
Dixie National Forest
Dominguez-Escalante Expedition, 1776
Drainage basins in Utah
Dubhe
Dutch oven

E
Economy of Utah
:Category:Economy of Utah
commons:Category:Economy of Utah
Education in Utah
:Category:Education in Utah
commons:Category:Education in Utah
Elections in the State of Utah
commons:Category:Utah elections
Environment of Utah
commons:Category:Environment of Utah

F

Festivals in Utah
commons:Category:Festivals in Utah
Fillmore, Utah, territorial capital 1850-1858
Films set in Utah
Films shot in Utah
Fishlake National Forest
Five Mile Pass
Flag of the State of Utah
Flora of Utah
Forts in Utah
:Category:Forts in Utah
commons:Category:Forts in Utah
Four Corners
Four Corners Monument

G

Geography of Utah
:Category:Geography of Utah
commons:Category:Geography of Utah
Geology of Utah
commons:Category:Geology of Utah
Geology of Utah
Geysers of Utah
commons:Category:Geysers of Utah
Ghost towns in Utah
:Category:Ghost towns in Utah
commons:Category:Ghost towns in Utah
Glen Canyon National Recreation Area
Government of the State of Utah  website
:Category:Government of Utah
commons:Category:Government of Utah
Governor of the State of Utah website
List of governors of Utah
Grand Staircase–Escalante National Monument
Great Basin
Great Salt Lake
Great Salt Lake Desert
Great Seal of the State of Utah
Green River

H

Heritage railroads in Utah
commons:Category:Heritage railroads in Utah
High schools in Utah
Highway Patrol of Utah
Highways (state) in Utah
Minor state highways in Utah
Hiking trails in Utah
commons:Category:Hiking trails in Utah
History of Utah
Historical outline of Utah
:Category:History of Utah
commons:Category:History of Utah
Hospitals in Utah
Hot springs of Utah
commons:Category:Hot springs of Utah
Hovenweep National Monument

I
Images of Utah
commons:Category:Utah
Indian Creek Wilderness Study Area
Indian ricegrass
Interstate Highways in Utah
Islands in Utah

J
Jell-O
Jim Bridger

K

Kings Peak

L
Lake Bonneville
Lakes of Utah
Bear Lake
Great Salt Lake
Lake Powell
Utah Lake
commons:Category:Lakes of Utah
Landforms of Utah
Landmarks in Utah
commons:Category:Landmarks in Utah
Larus californicus
Latter-day Saints, The Church of Jesus Christ of
Latter-day Saints topics
Legislature of the State of Utah website
List of Utah legislatures
Lieutenant Governor of the State of Utah website
List of lieutenant governors of Utah
Lists related to the State of Utah:
List of airports in Utah
List of bridges on the National Register of Historic Places in Utah
List of artists in Utah
List of birds of Utah
List of bouldering sites in Utah
List of Brigham Young University people
List of canyons and gorges in Utah
List of census statistical areas in Utah

List of colleges and universities in Utah
List of committees of the 57th Utah State Legislature
List of counties in Utah
List of dams and reservoirs in Utah
List of forts in Utah
List of ghost towns in Utah
List of governors of Utah
List of high schools in Utah
List of state highways in Utah
List of state highways serving Utah state parks and institutions
List of hospitals in Utah
List of individuals executed in Utah since 1976
List of Interstate Highways in Utah
List of islands in Utah
List of lakes of Utah
List of lieutenant governors of Utah
List of mayors of Salt Lake City
List of military installations in Utah
List of minor state highway routes in Utah
List of mountain ranges of Utah
List of municipalities in Utah
List of musical groups in Utah
List of named highway junctions in Utah
List of National Scenic Byways in Utah
List of newspapers in Utah
List of people from Utah
List of plateaus and mesas of Utah
List of power stations in Utah
List of professional sports teams in Utah
List of radio stations in Utah
List of railroads in Utah
List of Registered Historic Places in Utah
List of rivers of Utah
List of Salt Lake City media
List of scenic byways designated by the State of Utah
List of school districts in Utah
List of state highways in Utah
List of U.S. Highways in Utah
List of state legislatures of Utah
List of state parks of Utah
List of state prisons of Utah
List of television stations in Utah
List of topics about the Latter Day Saint movement
List of United States congressional delegations from Utah
List of United States congressional districts in Utah
List of United States representatives from Utah
List of United States senators from Utah
List of University of Utah people
List of Utah state symbols
List of Utah State University people
List of valleys of Utah
List of Wikipedia categories related to Utah
List of writers from Utah

M

Madrean Region
Malad River (Idaho-Utah)
Manti-La Sal National Forest
Maps of Utah
commons:Category:Maps of Utah
McInnis Canyons National Conservation Area
Metaphor: The Tree of Utah
Metropolitan areas in Utah
Micropolitan areas in Utah
Minor state highway routes in Utah
Moab, Utah
Moab Jeep Safari
Monument Valley
Monuments and memorials in Utah
commons:Category:Monuments and memorials in Utah
Mormon
Mormon Corridor
Mormon Miracle Pageant
Mormon Tabernacle Choir
Mormon Trail
Mount Nebo
Mount Peale
Mount Timpanogos
Mountain Meadows massacre
Mountains of Utah
Mountain peaks of the Rocky Mountains
commons:Category:Mountains of Utah
Mountain passes in Utah
Mountain ranges in Utah
Museums in Utah
:Category:Museums in Utah
commons:Category:Museums in Utah
Music of Utah
:Category:Music of Utah
commons:Category:Music of Utah
:Category:Musical groups from Utah
:Category:Musicians from Utah

N

National Forests of Utah
commons:Category:National Forests of Utah
National Monuments of Utah
commons:Category:National Monuments of Utah
National Natural Landmarks in Utah
National Parks in Utah
National Scenic Byways in Utah
National Wilderness Areas in Utah
National Wildlife Refuges in Utah
Native Americans in Utah
Natural arches of Utah
commons:Category:Natural arches of Utah
Natural Bridges National Monument
Natural arches in Utah
Natural disasters in Utah
Natural history of Utah
commons:Category:Natural history of Utah
Navajo Nation (Native American)
Navajo people
Newspaper Rock
Newspapers in Utah

O
Old Spanish Trail
Olympic Winter Games 2002
Oncorhynchus clarki utah
Organizations based in Utah
Oryzopsis hymenoides
Ouray National Wildlife Refuge
Outdoor sculptures in Utah
commons:Category:Outdoor sculptures in Utah

P
Parks in Utah
People from Utah
:Category:People from Utah
commons:Category:People from Utah
:Category:People by city in Utah
:Category:People by county in Utah
Picea pungens
Politics of Utah
commons:Category:Politics of Utah
Pony Express
Professional sports teams in Utah
Protected areas of Utah
commons:Category:Protected areas of Utah
Prunus avium

R

Radio stations in Utah
Railroad museums in Utah
commons:Category:Railroad museums in Utah
Railroads in Utah
Rainbow Bridge National Monument
Regions of Utah
Registered Historic Places in Utah
Religion in Utah
:Category:Religion in Utah
commons:Category:Religion in Utah
Religious buildings and structures in Utah
Rivers in Utah
Rock formations in Utah
commons:Category:Rock formations in Utah
Rocky Mountain Elk
Rocky Mountain Region
Rocky Mountains
Roller coasters in Utah
commons:Category:Roller coasters in Utah

S

Salt Lake City, Utah, capital of the extralegal State of Deseret 1849–1850, territorial and state capital since 1858
Salt Lake City mayors
Salt Lake City media
Salt Palace
Salt Lake Tabernacle
Salt Lake Temple
Salt Lake Tribune
San Rafael Swell
Sawtooth National Forest
Scenic byways of Utah
School districts in Utah
Scouting in Utah
Seal of the State of Utah
Sego Lily
Settlements in Utah
Cities in Utah
Towns in Utah
Townships in Utah
Census Designated Places in Utah
Other unincorporated communities in Utah
List of ghost towns in Utah
Ski areas and resorts in Utah
commons:Category:Ski areas and resorts in Utah
Southern Utah Wilderness Alliance, environmental organization
Spanish sweet onion
Sports in Utah
:Category:Sports in Utah
commons:Category:Sports in Utah
:Category:Sports venues in Utah
commons:Category:Sports venues in Utah
Square dance
State highways in Utah
State legislatures of Utah
State of Deseret
State of Utah website
Government of the State of Utah
:Category:Government of Utah
commons:Category:Government of Utah
Constitution of the State of Utah
Executive branch of the government of the State of Utah
Legislative branch of the government of the State of Utah
Judicial branch of the government of the State of Utah
State parks of Utah
State police of Utah
State prisons of Utah
Structures in Utah
commons:Category:Buildings and structures in Utah
Sundance Film Festival
Sundance Institute
Supreme Court of the State of Utah
Symbols of the State of Utah:
Utah state bird
Utah state cooking pot
Utah state emblem
Utah state fish
Utah state flag
Utah state flower
Utah state folk dance
Utah state fossil
Utah state fruit
Utah state gem
Utah state grass
Utah state hymn
Utah state insect
Utah state mammal
Utah state mineral
Utah state motto
Utah state nickname
Utah state rock
Utah state seal
Utah state snack food
Utah state song
Utah state star
Utah state stellar cluster
Utah state tartan
Utah state tree
Utah state vegetable

T

Telecommunications in Utah
commons:Category:Communications in Utah
Telephone area codes in Utah
Television shows set in Utah
Television stations in Utah
Temple Square
Territory of Utah
Theatres in Utah
commons:Category:Theatres in Utah
Timpanogos Cave National Monument
Topaz
Tourism in Utah  website
commons:Category:Tourism in Utah
Towns in Utah
Townships in Utah
Transcontinental Railroad
Transportation in Utah
:Category:Transportation in Utah
commons:Category:Transport in Utah
Treaty of Guadalupe Hidalgo of 1848
Trees of Utah

U

Uinta Mountains
Uinta-Wasatch-Cache National Forest
Unincorporated communities in Utah
Union Pacific Railroad
United States of America
States of the United States of America
United States census statistical areas of Utah
United States congressional delegations from Utah
United States congressional districts in Utah
United States Court of Appeals for the Tenth Circuit
United States District Court for the District of Utah
United States representatives from Utah
United States senators from Utah
University of Utah
University of Utah graduates
US-UT – ISO 3166-2:US region code for the State of Utah
UT – United States Postal Service postal code for the State of Utah
Utah website
:Category:Utah
commons:Category:Utah
commons:Category:Maps of Utah
Utah Centennial Tartan website
Utah Chamber Artists
Utah Coalition for Educational Technology
Utah Court of Appeals
Utah Department of Transportation
Utah Division of Services for People with Disabilities
Utah Education Association
Utah Foster Care
Utah Geological Survey
Utah Highway Patrol
Utah housing corporation
Utah in the American Civil War
Utah Jazz
Utah Lake
Utah Olympic Oval
Utah Seismic Safety Commission
Utah Shakespearean Festival
Utah State Capital
Utah State Capitol
Utah State Office of Rehabilitation
Utah State Parks
Utah State University
Utah State University graduates
Utah Supreme Court
Utah Symphony Orchestra
Utah Transfer of Public Lands Act
Utah Transit Authority
Utah Venture Capital Enhancement Act
Utah wine
Utah, This is the Place
Utah, We Love Thee
Utah’s HCBS ID/RC Waiver
Ute Nation (Native American)

V
Valleys in Utah
Volcanoes in Utah

W

Wasatch Front
Wasatch Range
Waterfalls of Utah
commons:Category:Waterfalls of Utah
Watersheds in Utah
Western honey bee
Western Pacific Railroad
Western Rocky Mountains
Wetlands in Utah
Wikimedia
Wikimedia Commons:Category:Utah
commons:Category:Maps of Utah
Wikinews:Category:Utah
Wikinews:Portal:Utah
Wikipedia Category:Utah
Wikipedia Portal:Utah
Wikipedia:WikiProject Utah
:Category:WikiProject Utah articles
:Category:WikiProject Utah members
Winter Olympics 2002
Writers from Utah

X
XIX Olympic Winter Games

Y
Young, Brigham

Z
Zion National Park
Zoos in Utah
commons:Category:Zoos in Utah

See also

Topic overview:
Utah
Outline of Utah

Utah
 
Utah